Pindus (Ancient Greek: Πίνδος), in Greek mythology, was the son of Makednos. He was friend with a snake and when his three brothers killed Pindus, the snake took revenge by killing them.

Notes

References 

 Claudius Aelianus, On the Characteristics of Animals, translated by Alwyn Faber Scholfield (1884-1969), from Aelian, Characteristics of Animals, published in three volumes by Harvard/Heinemann, Loeb Classical Library, 1958. Online version at the Topos Text Project.
 Claudius Aelianus, De Natura Animalium, Latin translation by Friedrich Jacobs in the Frommann edition, Jena, 1832. Latin translation available at Bill Thayer's Web Site
 Claudius Aelianus, De Natura Animalium, Rudolf Hercher. Lipsiae, in aedibus B. G. Teubneri, 1864.  Greek text available at the Perseus Digital Library.

Characters in Greek mythology
Mythology of Macedonia (ancient kingdom)